Kortehemmen is a village in Smallingerland municipality in the province of Friesland, the Netherlands. It had a population of around 258 in January 2017.

History 
The village was first mentioned in 1444 as Korteham, and means "short silted land near a stream". Korteham developed on a sandy ridge along the river  with Kortehemmen on one side and Zuider Drachten (nowadays part of Drachten) on the other. Around 1300, a church was built in the village. No tower was built and a belfry was added instead. The current belfry dates from 1950.

Kortehemmen was home to 127 people in 1840. Kortehemmen was physically cut off from Drachten by the construction of the A7 motorway.

Gallery

References

External links

Populated places in Friesland
Smallingerland